The 2022 All-Ireland Senior Ladies' Football Championship Final was the 49th All-Ireland Final and the deciding match of the 2022 All-Ireland Senior Ladies' Football Championship, an inter-county ladies' Gaelic football tournament for the county teams of Ireland. Meath retained the title, beating Kerry in the final.
If the game had been a draw, a replay would have been played on 13 or 14 August.

Match info

See also
 List of All-Ireland Senior Ladies' Football Championship finals

References

final
All-Ireland Senior Ladies' Football Championship Finals
All-Ireland Senior Football